Tony Barber (born 1940) is an English Australian game show host, radio announcer and television personality.

Tony Barber may also refer to:
Tony Barber (bassist) (born 1963), British bassist with Buzzcocks
Tony Barber (musician) (born 1942), Anglo-Australian, Billy Thorpe & the Aztecs
Anthony Barber (1920–2005), British politician, Chancellor of the Exchequer, 1970–1974
Anthony Barber (basketball) (born 1994), American basketball player, nicknamed  "Cat Barber"